The canton of Anzin is an administrative division of the Nord department, northern France. Its borders were modified at the French canton reorganisation which came into effect in March 2015. Its seat is in Anzin.

It consists of the following communes:
Anzin
Beuvrages
Bruay-sur-l'Escaut
Escautpont
Fresnes-sur-Escaut
Onnaing

References

Cantons of Nord (French department)